The Amazonas class comprises three offshore patrol vessels (OPVs) built by VT Shipbuilding (now BAE Systems Surface Ships). The ships entered service with the Brazilian Navy during 2012 and 2013.

Design and construction

They are designed to perform a range of Economic Exclusion Zone (EEZ) management, special operations and maritime law enforcement tasks.

The first vessel was named Port of Spain at her launch at BAE Systems Surface Ships’ Portsmouth facility, on 18 November 2009.

The second was named Scarborough on her launch a day later at Scotstoun in Glasgow, and began sea trials in July 2010, reaching .

The third was named San Fernando when launched on 16 July 2010 at Scotstoun on the River Clyde.

Operators

The Amazonas class were originally named as the Port of Spain class and built for the Trinidad and Tobago Coast Guard. Then, despite two of the vessels having been completed at the time and awaiting delivery, and with crew training ongoing in the United Kingdom, the Government of the Republic of Trinidad and Tobago (GORTT) cancelled the order in September 2010.

In December 2011 it was reported that the Brazilian Navy were interested in buying the vessels, and possibly up to five additional vessels of the same design. The sale, for £133 million, was then confirmed on 2 January 2012.

Amazonas was commissioned into the Brazilian Navy on 29 June in Portsmouth. During her one-month voyage to Brazil, she docked in the cities of Natal, Rio Grande do Norte and Salvador, Bahia in September, and was expected to arrive in Rio de Janeiro on 5 October.

Ships of class

Images

See also
 List of naval ship classes in service
 River-class patrol vessel, a design on which the Amazonas-class is based.

References

External links
Press release from BAE Systems
Product information from BAE Systems
BAE Systems Datasheet

Corvettes of the Brazilian Navy
Ships built on the River Clyde
Corvette classes